Sophie Amanda Walløe (born 14 April 2000) is a Danish former para table tennis player who competed in international elite competitions. She is a World silver medalist and a four-time European medalist, she reached the bronze medal match at the 2016 Summer Paralympics but was defeated by home favourite Bruna Costa Alexandre in straight sets.

References

2000 births
Living people
People from Gladsaxe Municipality
Paralympic table tennis players of Denmark
Danish female table tennis players
Table tennis players at the 2016 Summer Paralympics
Sportspeople from the Capital Region of Denmark